Simone Cairoli (born 7 July 1990) is an Italian male decathlete, who won six national championships. In 2017 with his personal best had reached the 5th place in the national all-time lists and 52nd place in the seasonal world lists.

Biography
Simone Cairoli finished at 12th at the 2017 European Athletics Indoor Championships, establishing his personal best, and was selected for 2018 European Athletics Championships.

Curiously he is a specialist of the decathlon (sport) working as a clerk at Decathlon (shop).

His first European final
After the first day of events at the 2018 European Championships, Cairoli finished 6th with 2110 points.

Personal best 
Decathlon
7942 pts ( Berlin, 7–8 August 2018) at the 2018 European Championships
100 m: 10.94, long jump: 7.49 m, shot put: 13.25 m, high jump: 2.05 m, 400 m: 48.77;
 110 m hs: 14.66, discus throw: 35.30 m, pole vault: 4.60 m, javelin throw: 59.62 m, 1500 m: 4:28.30

Previous Decathlon Personal Best
7875 pts ( Götzis, 2 May 2017) at the 2017 Hypo-Meeting
100 m: 10.79, long jump: 7.37 m, shot put: 13.04 m, high jump: 2.03 m, 400 m: 49.95;
 110 m hs: 14.72, discus throw: 37.53 m, pole vault: 4.50 m, javelin throw: 56.36 m, 1500 m: 4:21.14

Heptathlon
5841 pts ( Belgrade, 5 March 2017) at the 2017 European Indoor Championships
 60 m: 7.04, long jump: 7.55 m , shot put: 12.21 m, high jump: 2.04 m, 
 60 m hs: 8.31 , pole vault: 4.60 m , 1000 m: 2:40.14

Achievements

National titles
He won 8 times the national championships.
 Italian Athletics Championships
 Decathlon: 2015, 2016
 Italian Indoor Athletics Championships
 Heptathlon: 2014, 2015, 2017, 2018, 2019, 2020

See also
 Italian all-time top lists - Decathlon
 Italy at the 2018 European Athletics Championships

References

External links
 

1990 births
Living people
Italian decathletes